Murder At Sorrow's Crown is a mystery pastiche novel written by Steven Savile and Robert Greenberger, featuring Sherlock Holmes and Dr. John Watson, set shortly after the First Boer War.

Titan Books published the book in 2016, as part of its Further Adventures series, which collects a number of noted Holmesian pastiches, as well as original material.

Plot
July 1881: a mother comes to Sherlock Holmes to find her son. A naval officer posted to HMS Dido to fight the Boers. However, he did not return with his men, and is now being denounced as a deserter and traitor. Can Holmes uncover the truth, a truth that threatens the Empire with assassination, diamond mines and military cover-ups?

See also
 Sherlock Holmes pastiches

References

External links
Murder At Sorrow's Crown at Titan Books

2016 British novels
Sherlock Holmes pastiches
Sherlock Holmes novels
Novels set in Europe
England in fiction
Titan Books titles